Årdal Church may refer to:

Årdal Church (Agder), a church in Bygland municipality in Agder county, Norway
Årdal Church (Rogaland), a church in Hjelmeland municipality, Rogaland county, Norway
Old Årdal Church, a church in Hjelmeland municipality, Rogaland county, Norway
Årdal Church (Vestland), a church in Årdal municipality, Vestland county, Norway

See also
Årdal (disambiguation)
Ardal (disambiguation)